La Recta Provincia is a four-part 2007 Chilean TV miniseries written and directed by Raúl Ruiz which was edited into a feature film and shown at the Rome Film Festival in 2007. It was the first of the two folklore-themed miniseries' Ruiz made for TVN, the second being Litoral (2008).

Cast
 Bélgica Castro
 Ignacio Agüero
 Ángel Parra
 Javiera Parra
 Francisco Reyes
 Alejandro Sieveking

References

External links
 
 Ruiz and the Devils by Gonzalo Maza

Spanish-language television shows
Films directed by Raúl Ruiz
2007 Chilean television series debuts
2007 Chilean television series endings
2000s Chilean television series